Edmonton is a home rule-class city in and the county seat of Metcalfe County, Kentucky, United States.  It is part of the Glasgow Micropolitan Statistical Area.  The population was 1,595 at the 2010 census and estimated at the same in 2019.

History
The area was first surveyed in 1800. The city was established by the Kentucky legislature as a trading post in 1818 and was named the county seat in 1860. The post office first opened on February 18, 1830 and was named (though incorrectly spelled) for Edmund Rogers.

Geography
Edmonton is located at  (36.980191, -85.620338).

Climate
The climate in this area is characterized by hot, humid summers and generally mild to cool winters.  According to the Köppen Climate Classification system, Edmonton has a humid subtropical climate, abbreviated "Cfa" on climate maps.

Demographics

As of the census of 2000, there were 1,586 people, 686 households, and 410 families residing in the city. The racial makeup of the city was 96.72% White, 1.95% African American, 0.06% Native American, 0.13% Asian, 0.25% from other races, and 0.88% from two or more races. Hispanic or Latino of any race were 0.50% of the population.

There were 686 households, out of which 28.7% had children under the age of 18 living with them, 39.1% were married couples living together, 17.5% had a female householder with no husband present, and 40.1% were non-families. 37.2% of all households were made up of individuals, and 20.7% had someone living alone who was 65 years of age or older. The average household size was 2.13 and the average family size was 2.77.

In the city, the population was spread out, with 22.6% under the age of 18, 8.3% from 18 to 24, 22.6% from 25 to 44, 21.6% from 45 to 64, and 24.8% who were 65 years of age or older. The median age was 42 years. For every 100 females, there were 73.9 males. For every 100 females age 18 and over, there were 69.8 males.

The median income for a household in the city was $18,807, and the median income for a family was $27,763. Males had a median income of $24,671 versus $18,646 for females. The per capita income for the city was $14,384. About 29.0% of families and 31.8% of the population were below the poverty line, including 43.5% of those under age 18 and 25.6% of those age 65 or over.

Education
Edmonton has a lending library, the Metcalfe County Public Library.

Notable people
 Kentucky Headhunters
 Tom Emberton, politician
 Black Stone Cherry

References

Cities in Metcalfe County, Kentucky
County seats in Kentucky
Populated places established in 1836
1836 establishments in Kentucky
Cities in Kentucky